Gray is an inner-city suburb of Palmerston. It is 23 km southeast of the Darwin CBD. Its local government area is the City of Palmerston, and it is bounded to the north and west by Temple Terrace, to the east is Chung Wah Terrace, and to the south and east is Emery Avenue. Gray is named after William Henry Gray who was born in London in 1808 and who after becoming interested in the scheme of colonising South Australia in 1834.

References

External links
https://web.archive.org/web/20110629040718/http://www.nt.gov.au/lands/lis/placenames/origins/greaterdarwin.shtml#g

Suburbs of Darwin, Northern Territory